Otematata is a town in the Waitaki District of Otago in New Zealand's South Island. It is defined as a "populated area less than a town" and the 2001 New Zealand census gave the "usually resident population count" as 243. By the 2018 census it had declined to 183 inhabitants. This was considerably higher in the 1960s during the construction of the Benmore and Aviemore dams.

Surrounded by rugged peaks and beautiful lakes of the Waitaki Valley, the earliest inhabitants of the area were Māori on hunting expeditions or travelling through the valley to reach the inland areas and mountain passes. Otematata in Māori means "place of good flint".

The Otematata township was built in 1958 as a base for the construction of the Aviemore and Benmore Dams. ECNZ (Electricity Corporation of New Zealand) used it as a base until the early 1990s. Prior to that there were a few 'high country' sheep stations, Rostiever Run owned by the Munro family and  Otematata Station owned by the Cameron family.

ECNZ's successors' presence is now minimal as the dams are operated by remote control, and Otematata is becoming a village of holiday homes. It is a popular holiday destination with a hotel, restaurant, camping ground, backpackers, and other basic services. The townships population swells to over 5000 people in the Christmas and New Year holiday season as holiday makers from around New Zealand come to enjoy the lakes. Water skiing is a popular pastime in the Waitaki Valley.

Like many inland areas, Otematata has weather that ranges from very cold in winter to very hot in summer. In the past five years, temperatures have ranged from 35.7 °C to −6.7 °C, with annual rainfall ranging from 282mm to 431mm.

Demographics
It is part of the larger Aviemore statistical area.

Otematata had a population of 183 at the 2018 New Zealand census, a decrease of 3 people (-1.6%) since the 2013 census, and a decrease of 6 people (-3.2%) since the 2006 census. There were 96 households. There were 96 males and 84 females, giving a sex ratio of 1.14 males per female. The median age was 58.8 years (compared with 37.4 years nationally), with 9 people (4.9%) aged under 15 years, 27 (14.8%) aged 15 to 29, 78 (42.6%) aged 30 to 64, and 66 (36.1%) aged 65 or older.

Ethnicities were 88.5% European/Pākehā, 8.2% Māori, 1.6% Pacific peoples, and 6.6% Asian (totals add to more than 100% since people could identify with multiple ethnicities).

Although some people objected to giving their religion, 49.2% had no religion, 44.3% were Christian and 1.6% were Buddhist.

Of those at least 15 years old, 12 (6.9%) people had a bachelor or higher degree, and 39 (22.4%) people had no formal qualifications. The median income was $27,700, compared with $31,800 nationally. The employment status of those at least 15 was that 87 (50.0%) people were employed full-time, and 24 (13.8%) were part-time.

References 

Waitaki District
Populated places in Canterbury, New Zealand
Populated lakeshore places in New Zealand